Final league standings for the 1925-26 St. Louis Soccer League, St. Louis, Missouri, United States.

League standings

Top goal scorers

External links
St. Louis Soccer Leagues (RSSSF)
The Year in American Soccer - 1926

1925-26
1925–26 domestic association football leagues
1925–26 in American soccer
St Louis Soccer
St Louis Soccer